Joash Gesse (born September 4, 1986, in Montreal, Quebec) is a retired Canadian football linebacker. He was drafted sixteenth overall by the BC Lions in the 2010 CFL Draft and signed a contract with the team on May 25, 2010. After spending three seasons with the Lions, he signed with the Edmonton Eskimos with whom he played with for two years. He played college football for the Montreal Carabins.  He is currently working as a high school teacher in Laval, Quebec, and has a girlfriend.

References

External links
Saskatchewan Roughriders bio 
Edmonton Eskimos bio 
BC Lions bio

1986 births
Living people
BC Lions players
Edmonton Elks players
Canadian football linebackers
Montreal Carabins football players
Players of Canadian football from Quebec
Saskatchewan Roughriders players
Canadian football people from Montreal